Bert Fortell (18 September 1924 – 27 August 1996)) was an Austrian actor.

Filmography

External links
 

1924 births
1996 deaths
Austrian male film actors
Austrian male television actors
Actors from Baden bei Wien
20th-century Austrian male actors